29th meridian may refer to:

29th meridian east, a line of longitude east of the Greenwich Meridian
29th meridian west, a line of longitude west of the Greenwich Meridian